The 1995 Scottish Cup Final was played between Celtic and Airdrieonians at Hampden Park on 27 May 1995.

Celtic won the match 1–0, with a goal by Pierre van Hooijdonk who headed in after a cross from the left by Tosh McKinlay.  This would prove to be the last occasion that the original Airdrieonians reached the final, with the club folding in 2002. Celtic's victory secured the club's first major trophy in six years - the last honour having been won in the 1989 Scottish Cup Final against Rangers - and ended one of the most unsuccessful periods in their history.

Match

Details

References

1995
Cup Final
Scottish Cup Final 1995
Scottish Cup Final 1995
20th century in Glasgow